A battery tower was a defensive tower built into the outermost defences of many castles, usually in the 16th century or later, after the advent of firearms. Its name is derived from the word battery, a group of several cannon.  

These, usually round, towers could house numerous cannon oriented in various directions and on several levels and their firepower was therefore clearly superior to that of any attackers who, at best, could only bring their cannon to bear on the main line of assault.

The individual levels of battery towers are often connected by ramps so that the cannon could be arranged in various ways at the many embrasures.

Where artillery towers were level with their adjacent walls they were called roundels.

There are battery towers at:  

 Bentheim Castle
 Nanstein Castle  
 Neudahn Castle
 Burg Castle
 Calenberg Castle
 Zwinger

See also 

Bastion
Roundel

Castle architecture
Fortified towers by type